Alert was an English motorcycle manufactured by Smith & Molesworth at Coventry between 1903 and 1906. The bikes were powered by 2.35, 2.75 and 3.25 bhp Sarolea engines.

References

Motorcycle manufacturers of the United Kingdom